"Something in the Air" is a song by English rock band Thunderclap Newman, written by Speedy Keen who also sang the song. It was a No. 1 single for three weeks in the UK Singles Chart in July 1969. The song has been used for films, television and adverts, and has been covered by several artists. The track was also included on Thunderclap Newman's only album release Hollywood Dream over a year later.

Background
In 1969, Pete Townshend, The Who's guitarist, was the catalyst behind the formation of the band. The concept was to create a band to perform songs written by drummer and singer Speedy Keen, who had written "Armenia City in the Sky", the first track on The Who Sell Out. Townshend recruited jazz pianist Andy "Thunderclap" Newman (a friend from art college), and 15-year-old guitarist Jimmy McCulloch, who later played lead guitar in Paul McCartney and Wings. Keen played the drums and sang the lead.

Production
Townshend produced the single, arranged the strings, and played bass under the pseudonym Bijou Drains. Originally titled "Revolution" but later renamed to avoid confusion with the Beatles' 1968 song of the same name, "Something in the Air" captured post-flower power rebellion, combining McCulloch's acoustic and electric guitars, Keen's drumming and falsetto vocals, and Newman's piano solo.

The song, beginning in E major, has three key changes, its second verse climbing to F-sharp major, and, via a roundabout transition, goes down to C major for Newman's barrelhouse piano solo. Following this, the last verse is, like the second, a tone above the previous verse, closing the song in A-flat major.

Reception
The single reached No. 1 in the UK Singles Chart just three weeks after release, holding off Elvis Presley in the process. The scale of the song's success surprised everyone, and there were no plans to promote Thunderclap Newman with live performances. Eventually a line-up—augmented by Jim Pitman-Avory on bass and McCulloch's elder brother Jack on drums—played a handful of gigs. Personal records say the band played live only five times, but Keen referred to a two-month tour, playing "everywhere". In the UK, the follow-up single "Accidents" came out only in May 1970 and charted at No. 46 for a week. The album Hollywood Dream peaked in Billboard at No. 163. The song and the band are one hit wonders. Labelle recorded an emotional cover of it alongside "The Revolution Will Not Be Televised" by Gil Scott-Heron for their 1973 album Pressure Cookin'.

Personnel
Andy "Thunderclap" Newman – piano; lead vocals on "Wilhelmina"
Speedy Keen – double-tracked lead vocal, drums
Jimmy McCulloch – lead and rhythm guitars
Pete Townshend – bass guitar (credited to "Bijou Drains"), orchestral arrangement

Chart performance (Thunderclap Newman version)

Appearance in other media

"Something in the Air" by Thunderclap Newman appeared on the soundtracks of several films, such as The Magic Christian (1969), which helped the single reach No. 37 in the United States, and The Strawberry Statement (1970), which prompted a reissue of the single that "bubbled under" the Billboard Hot 100 at No. 120. It later appeared in Kingpin (1996), Almost Famous (2000), The Dish (2000), and The Girl Next Door (2004). It also appeared on and was the title of the second disc in the Deluxe Edition of the Easy Rider soundtrack.

"Something in the Air" has been used extensively in television, most notably on an advertisement for British Airways which featured PJ O'Rourke. The song also appeared in a TV advert for the Austin Mini in the early 1990s, featuring 1960s fashion model Twiggy. More recently, a version of the song was used in the advertisements for the mobile phone service provider TalkTalk. (A similar advert for TalkTalk shown at the beginning of advert breaks during Big Brother features the opening bars). The song was featured in a number of episodes of 1960s-set UK police series Heartbeat. It is also used as the 'on hold' music for The Carphone Warehouse, of which Talk Talk is a part. The song was also featured in the pilot episode of the American television show Aliens in America and in the third-season episode Bad Earl of My Name Is Earl.  A version of the song recorded by Ocean Colour Scene was previously used by telephone provider Ionica. In 2008, this song appeared in a Coca-Cola commercial in Taiwan. It was also used in an episode of Prime Suspect 1973. In 2020, it was used in the opening episode of season two of Doom Patrol.

It was performed by The Chicks during their DCX MMXVI World Tour and appears on their live recording of that tour.

The song has been recorded by former Marillion singer Fish and was released on the CD version of the album Internal Exile.

Tom Petty and the Heartbreakers version

A cover of "Something in the Air" was recorded by Tom Petty and the Heartbreakers and included on their Greatest Hits album, released in 1993. "Something in the Air" did not appear on the 2008 re-issue of the album and instead was replaced by "Stop Dragging My Heart Around". A live version of the song was included in The Live Anthology, released in 2009.

Charts

See also
 List of 1960s one-hit wonders in the United States

References

1969 songs
1969 debut singles
1993 singles
Labelle songs
MCA Records singles
Protest songs
Song recordings produced by Pete Townshend
Song recordings produced by Rick Rubin
Thunderclap Newman songs
Tom Petty songs
Track Records singles
UK Singles Chart number-one singles